TT Hellenic Postbank (formerly the Greek Postal Savings Bank,  Tachidromiko Tamieftirio) was a commercial bank based in Athens, in Greece.
The bank's license was withdrawn in January 2013 and it was put into liquidation.

See also
Postal savings system

References

Defunct banks of Greece
Banks established in 1900
Greek companies established in 1900
Banks disestablished in 2013
2013 disestablishments in Greece
Postal savings system
Greek brands